Arabesk is a 1989 Turkish comedy film directed by Ertem Eğilmez. The film was Eğilmez's last before his death and caused controversy in Turkey for its attacks on Turkish pseudo-intellectuals.

Cast 
 Şener Şen - Sener
 Müjde Ar - Müjde
 Uğur Yücel - Ekrem
  - Kaya

References

External links 

1989 films
1980s black comedy films
Films scored by Attila Özdemiroğlu
Turkish black comedy films
1989 comedy films